Ambophthalmos eurystigmatephoros is a species of marine ray-finned fish belonging to the family Psychrolutidae.

References

Fish described in 1999
eurystigmatephoros
Marine fish of New Zealand